Michael Higgs (born 14 February 1962) is an English actor best known for prominent roles in two long-running television series: Eddie Santini in ITV1's The Bill and Andy Hunter in EastEnders, in addition to an 8-episode stretch as Dr Thomas Waugh in Bad Girls.

In 2012–2014 Higgs played Michael Clarke in the BBC sci-fi fantasy series Wizards vs Aliens.

Personal life
He is married to actress Caroline Catz, whom he met on the set of The Bill. They have a son who was born in 2001 and a daughter who was born in 2006.

Filmography

Films

TV

Stage

References

External links 
 

1962 births
Living people
People from Birmingham, West Midlands
English male soap opera actors
English male stage actors
21st-century English male actors
British male actors